Monasterolo di Savigliano is a comune (municipality) in the Province of Cuneo in the Italian Piedmont region, and is located about  south of Turin and about  north of Cuneo.

Monasterolo di Savigliano borders the following municipalities: Cavallermaggiore, Ruffia, Savigliano, and Scarnafigi.

The town originated from a castle built here by Thomas I of Saluzzo in 1241.

Demographic evolution

References 

Cities and towns in Piedmont